Locomía (also known as Loco Mía) was a Spanish pop group popular in the 1980s. They combined elements of tropical with British music of the new wave and New Romantics. Their first hit was the eponymous song "Locomia".

The original members were Francesc Picas, Manuel Arjona, Gard Passchier, and Luis Font. In 1982, the latter two were replaced by Juan Antonio Fuentes (later replaced by Santos Blanco) and Carlos Armas, and later Francesc Picas replaced Xavier Font. They often appeared in extravagant outfits that combined Spanish matador pants with frilly jackets done in eighteenth-century style. Fan-twirling was an important part of both their stage performance and their music videos. Both their outfits and their fan-twirling became trademarks of the group and contributed to their popularity.

On June 15, 2018, their singer Santos Blanco died at the age of 46, from natural causes.

On July 16, 2018, another ex-member, Frank Romero, died at the age of 46, in Huelva (Spain) from bacterial infection.

Discography
Taiyo (1989)Loco Vox (1991)Party Time (1992) Samba Pasion (1999)Corazon (2001)Loco Mia (2007)Imperium (2013)

Their first album was recorded in Spain. It was entitled Taiyo'' which means sun in Japanese.

References

External links
 
 

Spanish musical groups